Daniele Messina (born 19 March 1992) is an Italian professional footballer who plays for Serie D club Calcio Biancavilla.

Biography

Adrano
Messina started his career at Adrano.

Sampdoria
He joined U.C. Sampdoria in 2008 from Adrano initially in temporary deal. In 2009, he joined the Genoese club outright, for €40,000 on a four-year contract. He made his debut for Samp on UEFA Europa League match against Debrecen, on 26 January 2011.

Serie C loans
Messina left for Foligno in July 2011. In January 2012 he was signed by Sambonifacese. In July 2012 he joined Gavorrano. On 31 January 2013, he was signed by HinterReggio.

Malta
Circa February 2014 Messina joined Maltese club Vittoriosa Stars on free transfer.

Biancavilla
On 14 July 2019, Messina signed with Serie D club Calcio Biancavilla.

Career statistics

References

External links
 
 AIC profile (data by football.it) 

Living people
1992 births
Sportspeople from the Province of Catania
Association football defenders
Italian footballers
Italian expatriate footballers
U.C. Sampdoria players
A.S.D. Città di Foligno 1928 players
A.C. Sambonifacese players
U.S. Gavorrano players
Vittoriosa Stars F.C. players
Nuorese Calcio players
S.S.D. Pro Sesto players
U.S. Fiorenzuola 1922 S.S. players
Serie C players
Serie D players
Footballers from Sicily
Italian expatriate sportspeople in Malta
Expatriate footballers in Malta